Vectron can refer to:

Vectron (locomotive), a European locomotive produced by Siemens from 2010
 Vectron International, an American  manufacturer of crystal oscillators and related electronic products acquired by Microsemi
 RCG Vectron, a part of the Reliance Insurance Company
 Vectron, a video game for the Mattel Intellivision
 Vectron, a ZX Spectrum video game published by Firebird Software in 1985, based on the Disney film Tron